The 1982–83 UAB Blazers men's basketball team represented the University of Alabama at Birmingham as a member of the Sun Belt Conference during the 1982–83 NCAA Division I men's basketball season. This was head coach Gene Bartow's fifth season at UAB, and the Blazers played their home games at BJCC Coliseum. They finished the season 19–14, 9–5 in Sun Belt play and won the Sun Belt tournament. They received an automatic bid to the NCAA tournament as No. 10 seed in the Mideast region. The Blazers fell to Oklahoma in the opening round, 71–63.

Roster

Schedule and results

|-
!colspan=9 style=| Regular season

|-
!colspan=9 style=| Sun Belt tournament

|-
!colspan=9 style=| NCAA tournament

References

UAB Blazers men's basketball seasons
UAB
UAB